HBW may refer to:

 Brinell scale, measuring indentation hardness
 Handbook of the Birds of the World 
 Hawaiian baby woodrose (Argyreia nervosa), a perennial climbing vine with psychoactive seeds
 H-B Woodlawn, a school in Arlington, Virginia, United States
 HBW Balingen-Weilstetten, a German handball club
 Hot bridgewire
 Joshua Sanford Field, serving Hillsboro, Wisconsin, United States
Heartbreak Weather,  the second studio album by  Niall Horan.